John Paddock (1876–1965) was an English footballer who played as a forward for West Bromwich Albion, Brierley Hill Alliance, Walsall, Halesowen, Wellington Town, and Burslem Port Vale.

Career
John Paddock, the son of West Brom trainer Jack Paddock, started his career with West Bromwich Albion in 1899. He played some twenty league games, scoring at least one goal. He later had spells with Brierley Hill Alliance, Walsall, Halesowen and Wellington Town, before joining Burslem Port Vale in August 1906. He scored on his debut for the Vale; at outside-right in a 2–1 win over his old club West Brom at the Athletic Ground on 10 September. He played just eight Second Division games however, and was released at the end of the season as the club went into liquidation.

Career statistics
Source:

References

1876 births
1965 deaths
Sportspeople from West Bromwich
English footballers
Association football forwards
West Bromwich Albion F.C. players
Brierley Hill Alliance F.C. players
Walsall F.C. players
Halesowen Town F.C. players
Telford United F.C. players
Port Vale F.C. players
English Football League players